Like Cozy is an album by organist Shirley Scott recorded in 1960 and released on the Moodsville label.

Reception
The Allmusic review stated "The groove of the recordings heard on Like Cozy is what we've come to expect from Ms. Scott, late-night smooth groove that was heavy on ballads, medium bounce standards, and melodic interplay between leader and sidemen -- a trademark specialty of the label".

Track listing 
 "Like Cozy" (Shirley Scott) - 4:10   
 "Little Girl Blue" (Lorenz Hart, Richard Rodgers) - 4:59   
 "Laura" (Johnny Mercer, David Raksin) - 5:00   
 "You Do Something to Me" (Cole Porter) - 5:17   
 "Once in a While" (Michael Edwards, Bud Green) - 4:31   
 "'Deed I Do" (Walter Hirsch, Fred Rose) - 4:11   
 "More Than You Know" (Edward Eliscu, Billy Rose, Vincent Youmans) - 4:05   
 "My Heart Stood Still" (Hart, Rodgers) - 3:46

Personnel 
 Shirley Scott - organ
 George Duvivier - bass
 Arthur Edgehill - drums

References 

1960 albums
Albums produced by Esmond Edwards
Albums recorded at Van Gelder Studio
Moodsville Records albums
Shirley Scott albums